The 1972 St. Louis Cardinals season was the team's 91st season in St. Louis, Missouri and its 81st season in the National League. The Cardinals went 75–81 during the season and finished fourth in the National League East, 21½ games behind the Pittsburgh Pirates.

Offseason 
 February 25, 1972: Steve Carlton was traded by the Cardinals to the Philadelphia Phillies for Rick Wise.

Regular season 
Pitcher Bob Gibson won a Gold Glove this year.

Season standings

Record vs. opponents

Opening Day starters 
Matty Alou
Lou Brock
José Cruz
Bob Gibson
Joe Hague
Dal Maxvill
Ted Simmons
Ted Sizemore
Joe Torre

Notable transactions 
 May 15, 1972: Don Shaw was traded by the Cardinals to the Oakland Athletics for Dwain Anderson.
 May 16, 1972: Lowell Palmer was signed as a free agent by the Cardinals.
 May 18, 1972: Marty Martínez was traded by the Cardinals to the Oakland Athletics for Brant Alyea.
 June 6, 1972: Dan Larson was drafted by the Cardinals in the 1st round (21st pick) of the 1972 Major League Baseball Draft.
 June 7, 1972: Diego Seguí was sent to the Cardinals by the Oakland Athletics as part of a conditional deal.
 July 23, 1972: Brant Alyea was returned to the Oakland Athletics by the Cardinals.
 August 30, 1972: Dal Maxvill was traded by the Cardinals to the Oakland Athletics for a player to be named later and Joe Lindsey (minors). The Athletics completed the deal by sending Gene Dusen (minors) to the Cardinals on October 27.
 September 18, 1972: Lowell Palmer was selected off waivers from the Cardinals by the Cleveland Indians.

Roster

Player stats

Batting

Starters by position 
Note: Pos = Position; G = Games played; AB = At bats; H = Hits; Avg. = Batting average; HR = Home runs; RBI = Runs batted in

Other batters 
Note: G = Games played; AB = At bats; H = Hits; Avg. = Batting average; HR = Home runs; RBI = Runs batted in

Pitching

Starting pitchers 
Note: G = Games pitched; IP = Innings pitched; W = Wins; L = Losses; ERA = Earned run average; SO = Strikeouts

Other pitchers 
Note: G = Games pitched; IP = Innings pitched; W = Wins; L = Losses; ERA = Earned run average; SO = Strikeouts

Relief pitchers 
Note: G = Games pitched; W = Wins; L = Losses; SV = Saves; ERA = Earned run average; SO = Strikeouts

Awards and honors

League leaders 
 Lou Brock, National League leader, stolen bases, 63

Farm system 

LEAGUE CHAMPIONS: Modesto

References

External links
1972 St. Louis Cardinals at Baseball Reference
1972 St. Louis Cardinals team page at www.baseball-almanac.com

St. Louis Cardinals seasons
Saint Louis Cardinals season
St Louis